Cidade de Pedra is Portuguese for Stone Town.  It may refer to:

Stone Town, the old part of Zanzibar City
Stone Town, Mozambique